Move Way is an extended play album by electronic musician dBridge. It was released in August 2013 under R&S Records.
The track Move Way uses a vocal sample taken from an interview of Pete Rock, played in the intro of his track Ready Fe War, featuring Chip Fu

Track listing

References

2013 EPs